Chen Cho-yi (born 22 January 1985) is a Taiwanese Olympic swimmer, bioinformatician, and computational biologist. He is now a postdoctoral research fellow at the Dana–Farber Cancer Institute (DFCI), Harvard University.

Education and early life
Chen was born in Taipei, Taiwan. He received his bachelor's degree and master's degrees in Computer Science and Bioinformatics at National Taiwan University (NTU) in 2007 and 2009, respectively. He later served at Academia Sinica in 2009–2012. In 2014, granted by Ministry of Science and Technology (Taiwan), he visited University of Pittsburgh for one-year visiting research. He received his doctorate degree in Genome and Systems Biology at National Taiwan University in 2015.

Swimming career
Chen has represented his country in several international sporting events. He finished fourth in the final of the 200 m breaststroke at the 2001 East Asian Games in Osaka, Japan. He won two gold medals in 100 and 200 m breaststroke at the 2002 ISF World Gymnasiade in Caen, France. In the same year, he was decorated with Guo-Guang Sports Medal from the Executive Yuan for his achievement in World Gymnasiade. Chen is an eighth-place finalist in the 100 m breaststroke at the 2002 Asian Games in Busan, South Korea, having been disqualified for an illegal dolphin kick.

Chen qualified for the men's 100 m breaststroke at the 2004 Summer Olympics in Athens, by achieving a FINA B-standard of 1:04.66 from the National University Games in Taipei. He challenged seven other swimmers in heat three, including 15-year-old Nguyen Huu Viet of Vietnam. He edged out New Zealand's Ben Labowitch to take a second seed by five hundredths of a second (0.05), posting his lifetime best of 1:03.94. Chen failed to advance into the semifinals, as he placed thirty-fifth overall out of 60 swimmers on the first day of preliminaries.

Awards and honors
 Sportsmanship Award, National Intercollegiate Athletic Games, 2011
 Outstanding College Youth of the Republic of China, 2007
 National Taiwan University Outstanding College Youth, 2007
 Scholarship for Outstanding Performance, National Taiwan University, 2006
 Chinese Chia-Hsin Sports Scholarship, 2003, 2005
 Guo-Guang Sports Medal, the Republic of China, 2002

References

External links
 Chen Cho-Yi's profile at the Dana–Farber Cancer Institute

1985 births
Living people
Taiwanese male swimmers
Olympic swimmers of Taiwan
Swimmers at the 2004 Summer Olympics
Swimmers at the 2002 Asian Games
Taiwanese male breaststroke swimmers
Scientists from Keelung
Swimmers at the 2010 Asian Games
Asian Games competitors for Chinese Taipei
Sportspeople from Keelung
21st-century Taiwanese people